Fu Ziying (born September 1957) is a Chinese politician who served as director of the Macau Liaison Office from 2018 to 2022.

He was a delegate to the 19th National Congress of the Communist Party of China. He is an alternate member of the 19th CPC Central Committee.

Biography
Fu was born in Yueyang, Hunan, in September 1957. He entered the workforce in October 1974, and joined the Communist Party of China in July 1992. At the age of 17, he became a sent-down youth in the Down to the Countryside Movement. After the resumption of College Entrance Examination in September 1978, he entered the Hunan Finance and Economics Institute. He also studied at the Boston University and John F. Kennedy School of Government. After university in 1981, he was assigned to the Ministry of Foreign Trad. In 2003, he was promoted to become assistant minister of the newly established Ministry of Commerce. Five years later, he was promoted again to become the deputy minister, a position at vice-ministerial level. In November 2011 he was transferred to Nanjing, capital of east China's Jiangsu province, as its vice-governor of Jiangsu. In March 2015, he returned to Beijing, and was appointed head of Discipline Inspection Unit of the Central Commission for Discipline Inspection in the Publicity Department of the Communist Party of China. In February 2017, he returned to the Ministry of Commerce as Deputy Party Branch Secretary. On December 28, 2018, he was appointed director of the Macau Liaison Office, replacing Zheng Xiaosong, who died of depression in Macau after falling from a tall building where he lived.

References

External links
 Biography of Fu Ziying on ce.cn 

1957 births
Hunan University alumni
Living people
People's Republic of China politicians from Hunan
Chinese Communist Party politicians from Hunan
Alternate members of the 19th Central Committee of the Chinese Communist Party
Delegates to the 13th National People's Congress